Nine Types of Light is the fourth studio album by American rock band TV on the Radio, released on April 11, 2011, through Interscope Records. It is the final TV on the Radio album to feature bassist Gerard Smith, who died of lung cancer nine days after it was released. The album's lead single "Will Do" was released on February 23, 2011. Its closing track, "Caffeinated Consciousness", was made available on the band's website as a free download on March 10, 2011. Nine Types of Light was very well received by critics and has a "Universal Acclaim" rating of 82 at review aggregating website Metacritic.

Film
The band created an accompanying film to go with the album, an hourlong visual companion that offers music videos for all of Nine Types of Light's tracks. Packaged with a deluxe version of the CD, the film also exists on YouTube in its entirety. Characterized by eclectic visual style and thematic content as well as TV on the Radio's diverse, unique sound, the film allows for a different interpretation and method of experiencing the album. Directed by singer Tunde Adebimpe (with different directors helming the individual clips, see below for list), the film also features interviews with a variety of New Yorkers discussing topics including dreams, love, fame, and the future. A humorous epilogue, set to the song "You" and featuring the band members meeting for lunch ten years after a fictional breakup, concludes the film. Overall, the work can be seen as Afrofuturistic, particularly the video for "Will Do," which incorporates virtual-reality technology to tell a unique love story starring Adebimpe and Joy Bryant.

Track listing
 "Second Song" – 4:22
 "Keep Your Heart" – 5:43
 "You" – 4:05
 "No Future Shock" – 4:03
 "Killer Crane" – 6:15
 "Will Do" – 3:46
 "New Cannonball Blues" – 4:34
 "Repetition" – 3:46
 "Forgotten" – 3:40
 "Caffeinated Consciousness" – 3:21

Deluxe version
 "All Falls Down" – 4:55
 "Will Do" (Switch Remix) – 5:20
 "Will Do" (XXXChange Dancehall Mix) – 3:45

iTunes version
 "Troubles" (bonus track) – 3:04

Film
 "Caffeinated Consciousness" – dir. Tim Nackashi – 02:27
 "Second Song" – dir. Michael Please – 05:46
 "New Cannonball Blues" – dir. Maya Erdelyi – 11:05
 "No Future Shock" – dir. Jon Moritsugu & Amy Davis – 15:11
 "Repetition" – dir. Johnerick Lawson – 19:38
 "Will Do" – dir. Dugan O'Neal – 24:48
 "Keep Your Heart" – dir. Petro Papahadjopoulos – 28:29
 "Forgotten" – dir. Tunde Adebimpe – 34:09
 "Killer Crane" – dir. TV on the Radio & Dano Cerny – 39:26
 "You" – dir. Barney Clay – 49:17
 "Dragon Backwards" – dir. Tim Nackashi, Tunde Adebimpe & Jaleel Bunton – 59:09

Personnel
TV on the Radio
 Tunde Adebimpe – vocals, loops, keyboards
 Jaleel Bunton – drums, bass guitar, guitar, programming, organ, synthesizer, vocals
 Kyp Malone – vocals, guitar, bass guitar, synthesizer, clarinet, flute, viola
 David Andrew Sitek – programming, synthesizer, guitar, bass guitar, samples, vocals
 Gerard A. Smith – bass guitar, organ, samples, synthesizer, vocals

Additional musicians
 Priscilla Ahn – background vocals
 Stuart Bogie – horn
 Peter Hess – horn
 Dan Huron – percussion
 Michael Irwin – horn
 Kevin Moehringer – horn
 Gillian Rivers – strings
 Todd Simon – horn
 Kenny Wang – strings (viola)
 Lauren Weaver – strings

Production
 Jaleel Bunton – programming
 Rich Costey – mixing
 Steve Fallone – mastering
 David Andrew Sitek – producer, programming
 Zeph Sowers – engineer

Design
 Tunde Adebimpe – art direction, designer
 David Andrew Sitek – art direction, designer, photographer
 Nick Walker – assistant photographer

Charts

References

TV on the Radio albums
2011 albums
Interscope Records albums
Albums produced by Dave Sitek
Soul albums by American artists